"Venus in Chains" is a song recorded by German dance act U96, released in 1996 as the third and last single from their fourth album, Heaven (1996). It features vocals by German singer Dorothy Lapi (a.k.a. Dea-Li) and peaked at number seven in the Czech Republic. Additionally, it was a top 20 hit in Austria and a top 60 hit in Sweden. A music video was produced to promote the single, directed by German music video and film director Martin Weisz.

Critical reception
Pan-European magazine Music & Media wrote, "She sings she's a slave in chains. Eurohouse is becoming kinky business with this new single by German submarinehitmachine. The up-tempo beats refrain from hardcore rave frenzy and the melody hooks are definitely catchy."

Track listing
 CD single, Germany
"Venus in Chains" (Video Mix) – 3:30
"In Chains" – 5:02 

 CD maxi, Germany
"Venus in Chains" (Video Mix) – 3:30
"Venus in Chains" (In Chains) – 5:02
"Venus in Chains" (Bass Bumpers Remix) – 5:56
"1-900-LOVE" – 4:02

 CD maxi (Remix), Germany
"Venus in Chains" (Future Breeze Mix) – 6:47
"Venus in Chains" (Klubbheads Venusheuvel Mix) – 6:46

Charts

References

 

1996 singles
1996 songs
English-language German songs
Music videos directed by Martin Weisz
Song recordings produced by Alex Christensen
Songs written by Alex Christensen
U96 songs